Robert Joseph Hallen (born March 9, 1975) is a former American football player.

Hallen played high school football at Mentor High School, where he was honorable mention all-state his senior season after serving as team captain.  Hallen was a four-year starter at Kent State University while starting 44 consecutive games. In the Spring of 1997, Hallen was awarded the Don Nottingham Cup as the team's top offensive player at the conclusion of Spring practice. He was a first-team All-Mid-American Conference choice in 1997 after switching to right tackle after three seasons at center. Hallen also served as team captain during the senior year.

Following his senior season, Hallen was chosen to play in the 1998 Senior Bowl in Mobile, Alabama, marking the first time a Kent State player participated in this bowl game. Hallen was selected in the 1998 NFL Draft by the Atlanta Falcons in the second round  (53rd overall) and went on to play in Super Bowl XXXIII.  He played from 1998 to 2001 for the Falcons. He also played for the San Diego Chargers from 2002 to 2005. He signed with the Cleveland Browns prior to the 2006 NFL season.

Hallen's career came to an end on August 11, 2006 when he announced his retirement due to ongoing problems with his back, which he first injured in the 2001 season while playing for the Falcons.

Hallen announced his retirement shortly after he was named the Browns' starting center in place of injured LeCharles Bentley. Hallen had left practice several days earlier complaining of back spasms. Hallen notified the Browns of his retirement in a letter.

Hallen was inducted into Mentor High School's Sports Hall Of Fame in 2005 and the Kent State University's Varsity "K" Hall Of Fame in 2014.

Hallen currently works for a fire department in the Greater Cleveland area.

References

1975 births
Living people
American football offensive guards
Atlanta Falcons players
Kent State Golden Flashes football players
Kent State University alumni
People from Mentor, Ohio
Players of American football from Ohio
San Diego Chargers players
Sportspeople from Greater Cleveland
Mentor High School alumni